Schloss Rohrau is a castle in the town of Rohrau in Lower Austria, bordering on Burgenland. The building houses the art collection of the counts of Harrach.

Medieval castle and "Herrschaft" or dominion 
In the 12th century, the Marquis of Cham and Vohburg held the area around Rohrau. Dietrich de Rorow was first mentioned in 1240 as living in the Haus Liechtenstein. His line died out in 1278 with Dietrich III. His daughter Diemut married Leutold I von Stadeck († 1292/95). After the death of the last Johann Stadeck in 1399, Duke Wilhelm wanted to give it to his brother Ernst dem Eisernen, but heiress Guta married Hermann II, Count of Celje and received it from King Wenceslaus IV of Bohemia as a gift. In 1402, Rohrau came into the hands of Ulrich, son of Hugo von Montfort-Pfannberg, who inherited from Guta. In 1404, King Ruprecht gave the Montforts the castle and dominion, which they owned for 120 years.

Harrach family 
The Harrach family first appeared in southern Bohemia in the 13th century, later in neighbouring Mühlviertel, including the wealthy town of Freistadt. The Harrachs owned estates in Styria and Carinthia at one time, but their main interests shifted to Vienna (see Palais Harrach) and Lower Austria.

Leonhard III von Harrach inherited the castle and in 1524, during the Counter-Reformation, his son Leonhard IV took the side of the Catholics. He was granted nobility in 1552 and, in 1584, the Order of the Golden Fleece. In 1586, he retired after 55 years of service to the court of Vienna and devoted himself to the Rohrau castle. He died in 1590 and was buried in the Augustinian Church, Vienna.

In 1593, the Turks stormed the castle. The damage was repaired in 1599–1605 and is documented in the family's archives.

Art collection 

The castle houses the Graf Harrach’sche Familiensammlung, one of the largest private collections in Austria. In April 2006, thieves broke in and stole 16 paintings by Rembrandt, Van Dyck, Rubens and Peter Snayers.

The castle and its collection now belong by inheritance to the counts of Waldburg-Zeil.

References

Literature 
 Ulrich Graf von und zu Arco-Zinneberg, Schloss Rohrau - Graf Harrach'sche Familiensammlung, Kleiner Kunstführer, Verlag Schnell & Steiner, Regensburg; 4., neu bearbeitete Auflage 2012.
 Helmuth Furch, Das Gräflich Harrachsche Familienarchiv, Schloss Rohrau, Antonius Tencalla, Steinmetz im kayßerischen Steinbruch am Leyttaberg, in Mitteilungen des Museums- und Kulturvereines Kaisersteinbruch, Nr. 37, S 7–13, Juni 1995.
 Wolfgang Westerhoff, Prangersäulen in Österreich, Verlag NÖ-Pressehaus, 1994.

External links 

 Schloss Rohrau - official website
 
 Rohrau Harrach
 
 Museum Niederösterreich)
 Helmuth Furch 1995, Gräfl. Harrachsches Archiv und der Kaiser-Steinbruch

Harrach family
Castles in Lower Austria
Museums in Lower Austria
Art museums and galleries in Austria